Pooja Jhaveri (born 13 March 1992) is an Indian actress who appears in Telugu, Tamil and Gujarati films. She made her debut with the Telugu film Bham Bolenath in 2015.

Personal life
Jhaveri was born into a Gujarati family in a small town near Vapi in Valsad district in southern Gujarat, where she was raised, and later she moved with her family to Mumbai for her studies.

Career
Jhaveri started her acting career in Telugu film industry with film Bham Bolenath in 2015, and then appeared in films like Right Right, a remake of Malayalam film Ordinary. She also appeared in Tamil films Thodari and Rukkumani Vandi Varudhu. Her latest Telugu film, Bangaru Bullodu released on 23 January 2021.

Filmography

Films

References

External links

Living people
People from Vapi
Actresses from Gujarat
Actresses from Mumbai
Indian film actresses
Actresses in Telugu cinema
Actresses in Tamil cinema
Actresses in Gujarati cinema
Gujarati people
21st-century Indian actresses
1992 births